Language Marketplace Inc is a business translation services company with its corporate headquarters located in Mississauga, Ontario, Canada.  According to their website, it provides translation and interpreter services in over 140 languages and mentions a client base of over 3000 organizations worldwide in both the public and private sectors. Notable public sector clients include Health Canada, Correctional Services of Canada, RCMP, and Public Services and Procurement Canada. Notable private sector clients include TransCanada Pipelines, Agrium, and Hertz Corporation.

History and Overview

The firm was founded in 2000 in Mississauga, Ontario, Canada. It opened its first international operation in 2008 in Portugal to service its European Union clientele.

References



Translation companies